Noir Désir en public is a live album by French rock band Noir Désir, released on 19 September 2005. It documents their last tour in 2002.

Track listing 
All titles by Bertrand Cantat/Noir Désir except where noted.

Disc 1

Disc 2

Credits 
 Denis Barthe: drums, samples, background vocals
 Bertrand Cantat: guitar, harmonica, lead vocals
 Jean-Paul Roy: bass guitar, keyboards, background vocals
 Serge Teyssot-Gay: guitar, keyboards, background vocals
 Christophe Perruchi: keyboards, samples, background vocals
 Akosh Szelevényi: clarinet on Le vent nous portera
 Isabelle Sajot: cello on Bouquet de nerfs, Le Fleuve and Des visages des figures
 Vincent Debruyne: viola on Bouquet de nerfs, Le Fleuve and Des visages des figures
 Dominique Juchors: violin on Bouquet de nerfs, Le Fleuve and Des visages des figures
 Anne Lepape: violin on Bouquet de nerfs, Le Fleuve and Des visages des figures
 Romain Humeau: strings arrangements on Des visages des figures
 Joe Mardin: strings arrangements on Bouquet de nerfs and Le Fleuve
 Recording: Bob Coke with assistance from François Brely
 Direction: Noir Désir
 Mixing: Noir Désir and Bob Coke
 Mastering: Alexis Bardinet, Denis Barthe and Bob Coke

Charts

References 

Noir Désir albums
2005 live albums
Barclay (record label) live albums